The Queens Community Board 14 is a local government in the New York City borough of Queens, encompassing the neighborhoods of Breezy Point, Belle Harbor, Neponsit, Arverne, Bayswater, Edgemere, Rockaway Park, Rockaway and Far Rockaway. It is bounded to the north by Brooklyn and Jamaica Bay, on the east by the Nassau County border, and to the south by the Atlantic Ocean.

References

External links
Profile of the Community Board

Community boards of Queens